The Austrian women's national under 18 ice hockey team is the national under-18 ice hockey team in Austria. The team represents Austria at the International Ice Hockey Federation's Ice Hockey U18 Women's World Championship.

Women's World U18 Championship record

*Includes one win in extra time (in the preliminary round)

Team

Current roster
Roster for the 2023 IIHF Ice Hockey U18 Women's World Championship Division I Group A.

Head coach: Mario BellinaAssistant coaches: Lukáš Chromý, Philipp Holper, Tomáš Kala

References

Ice hockey
Women's national under-18 ice hockey teams